Aslan Magomedovich Mutaliyev (born 10 February 2002) is a Russian football player. He plays as left midfielder for Kuban Krasnodar.

Club career
He made his debut in the Russian Football National League for FC Spartak-2 Moscow on 15 May 2021 in a game against FC Chertanovo Moscow.

On 21 June 2022, Mutaliyev signed a three-year contract with FC Veles Moscow.

International career
He represented Russia at the 2019 UEFA European Under-17 Championship and scored one goal as Russia was eliminated at group stage.

References

External links
 
 Profile by Russian Football National League

2002 births
People from Nazran
Living people
Russian footballers
Russia youth international footballers
Association football midfielders
FC Spartak-2 Moscow players
FC Veles Moscow players
FC Urozhay Krasnodar players
Russian First League players